McCrone is an Irish surname originating in pre 10th century Ulster, Ireland Notable people with the surname include:

Guy McCrone (1898–1977), Scottish writer
Josh McCrone (born 1987), Australian rugby league player
Senga McCrone (born 1936), Scottish bowls player
Walter McCrone (1916–2002), American chemist

See also
McCrone report, a United Kingdom government dossier
McCrone Agreement, an agreement regarding teachers' pay in Scotland
McCrone Research Institute, an American microscopy research institute

References